Chester Leroy Harriott (24 February 1933 – 4 July 2013) was a Jamaican-born pianist and entertainer known for his eight years as one part of the variety act Harriott and Evans.

Life 
Harriott was born in St Thomas, Jamaica, the son of a doctor's assistant, Oscar Harriott, and his wife, Minna, (née Powell), a teacher. They later moved to the island's capital, Kingston, then the United States to study, leaving Chester and his siblings with relatives.

A gifted pianist from a young age, he appeared on local radio stations and followers set up a fund for him to study in London; in 1950, he joined Trinity College of Music and while there met Arthur Bennett, who taught him modern music. Through that connection, Harriott was introduced to the nightclub scene in central London, playing at the Langham Club for the likes of Princess Margaret. Throughout the early 1950s, he performed at Gateways, a pioneering lesbian club in Chelsea, as well as the Mandrake Club in Soho and the Sunset Club, where he performed alongside the celebrated jazz saxophonist Joe Harriott.

After finishing at Trinity, he partnered up with John Porter to form a double-act, but soon switched to form a lasting duo with Victor Brown. Performing for eight years as Harriott and Evans, a variety act, they travelled to Paris, toured and sold 50,000 copies of one album. In 1962, they parted ways and Harriott carried on performing solo before working for Granada Television from 1967. He opened a restaurant called Truffles in 1985 and retired from performing following an illness in the late-1990s. He outlived his first wife, Petronia, and later married a magician called Claudine. Harriott died on 4 July 2013 aged eighty years. He had five children, including the television chef Ainsley Harriott.

References

Notes

Citations

1933 births
2013 deaths
Jamaican jazz pianists
Jamaican jazz singers
Alumni of Trinity College of Music